Don Black may refer to:
 Don Black (lyricist) (born 1938), English lyricist
 Don Black (white supremacist) (born 1953), American white supremacist activist
 Don Black (baseball) (1917–1959), American baseball player
 Don Black (tennis) (1927–2000), Rhodesian tennis player

See also
 Donald Black (disambiguation)